Dayana Alejandra González Araya (born 31 October 1987) is a Chilean political activist who was elected as a member of the Chilean Constitutional Convention.

In November 2021, her advisor caused controversy after interrupting a Ruth Hurtado's press point. Nevertheless, González defender her.

References

External links
 BCN Profile

Living people
1987 births
Chilean activists
People from Santiago
21st-century Chilean politicians
21st-century Chilean women politicians
Members of the List of the People
Members of the Chilean Constitutional Convention
University of Tarapacá alumni